Dicolectes is a genus of leaf beetles in the subfamily Eumolpinae. It is distributed in Africa.

Species
 Dicolectes atripes Pic, 1953
 Dicolectes aulicus Lefèvre, 1886
 Dicolectes clavareaui Kuntzen, 1914
 Dicolectes erythropus Lefèvre, 1886
 Dicolectes fortis (Weise, 1895)
 Dicolectes impressiceps Pic, 1938
 Dicolectes minor (Weise, 1903)
 Dicolectes ornatus (Jacoby, 1894)
 Dicolectes rufipes Pic, 1938
 Dicolectes rugulosus Lefèvre, 1886
 Dicolectes semipurpureus Pic, 1938
 Dicolectes spinicollis Burgeon, 1941

References

Eumolpinae
Chrysomelidae genera
Beetles of Africa
Taxa named by Édouard Lefèvre